The mint moth (Pyrausta aurata) is a small moth from the family Crambidae, also known by the common name Small Purple and Gold.

Distribution
This species can be found in most of Europe and it is also widespread in North Africa and North Asia. In the east it is present from  Siberia to North China, Korea and Japan, in the south, it covers Asia Minor, the Middle East, Iran, Afghanistan, Middle Asia and Mongolia.

Habitat
These moths inhabit chalk and limestone grassland, woodland, marshland and gardens.

Description

The forewings are purplish-brown with golden yellow markings. The number and intensity of these markings is quite variable. Usually in the forewings there is a single postmedian round golden spot near the costa, often with some other minor golden spots. The yellow spots can also be greatly reduced up to the complete absence. Sometimes there an almost indistinct wavy golden postmedian line between the dorsum and the main golden spot. The hindwings are dark brown or also black with a broad yellow transverse band approximately in the wing center and without additional spot closer to the basal area.

The moth is very similar to the related Pyrausta purpuralis, a slightly larger moth with a broad postmedian continuous band, usually divided into at least three yellow spots.

The caterpillar can reach a length of 13 mm. It may be light green, dark green, light brown, black gray or reddish, with a darker back line. The head is brownish black. Pupa is quite slender, red-brown to black-brown.

Biology
In the UK, it has two broods; in May/June, and July/August. In north-west Europe it can be seen from April until the end of September and is capable of having two generations in each season.

It flies both at day and at night. As the name suggests, the mint moth often uses mint (Mentha spicata. Mentha rotundifolia) as a food plant, though it can also be found on other species such as marjoram, Salvia pratensis, Melissa officinalis, Nepeta cataria and Calamintha species.

Gallery

References

External links

 Paolo Mazzei, Daniel Morel, Raniero Panfili Moths and Butterflies of Europe and North Africa
 BioLib

Pyrausta (moth)
Moths described in 1763
Moths of Asia
Moths of Europe
Moths of Africa
Taxa named by Giovanni Antonio Scopoli
Articles containing video clips